Virginia Home is a historic boarding house located at Fieldale, Henry County, Virginia. It was built in 1920, and is a two-story, seven-bay, frame structure with a hipped roof and a full, two-story porch. Also on the property are a contributing cook's house, a wash house, and a one-story cottage for
the staff of the Virginia Home.  The Virginia Home was built by Marshall Field and Company as a boarding house for workers at the Fieldcrest Mills.

It was listed on the National Register of Historic Places in 2000.  It is located in the Fieldale Historic District.

References

Houses on the National Register of Historic Places in Virginia
Houses completed in 1920
Houses in Henry County, Virginia
National Register of Historic Places in Henry County, Virginia
Individually listed contributing properties to historic districts on the National Register in Virginia